The 2001 Clipsal 500 was the third running of the Adelaide 500 race. Racing was held form Friday 6 April until Sunday 8 April 2001. The race was held for V8 Supercars and was Round 2 of the 2001 Shell Championship Series.

Format 
The format, unique to V8 Supercar and loosely similar to the Pukekohe 500 format, splits the 500 kilometres into two separate 250 kilometres races each held on a different day. Points were assigned separately to the races, with more points allocated for Race 2 over Race 1, and they combined to award a round result.

Official results

Top fifteen shootout

Race 1

Race 2

Round results

Championship Standings

References

External links
 Official race results
 Official V8 Supercar website

Adelaide 500
Clipsal 500
2000s in Adelaide